Basil Mohammad Ramzan Akram (born 23 February 1993) is an English first-class cricketer. Born at Waltham Forest, Essex, Akram is a right-handed batsman who bowls right-arm fast-medium.

Having represented Essex at youth level, Akram represented Northamptonshire County Cricket Club playing for the Second XI before turning out for Loughborough MCCU for the start of the 2014 season. He made his first-class debut for them in a Universities match against Sussex beginning on 1 April 2014. In the first innings of this match Akram was able to achieve Figure of 2/82 from 14 overs dismissing opener Luke Wells (38) and Matt Prior (43) in this innings. In the second innings Akram only bowled 3 overs conceding 6 runs leading to him finishing with match figures of 2/88. He scored 36 and 1. The match was drawn.

Akram's performance in this game alerted Hampshire and he was selected to feature for their Second XI. His performances here led to him being awarded a Development Contract by the county for the remainder of the 2014 season and 2015 season. He also made his List A debut in a Royal London 50-over match against Yorkshire on 21 August 2014. Batting first Akram only scored 1 run before being dismissed by Adil Rashid. He also finished with figures of 0/24 from 2 overs in a match that Yorkshire won by 6 wickets.

At the end of the 2015 season, it was announced that Akram was one of three players who were being released by Hampshire as their contracts expired.  Akram had made only one appearance, in a limited-overs match.

Akram continued to represent Loughborough MCCU where he played a total of 6 first class games. In these games he performed well with both bat and ball. In 2016 he scored 160 against Surrey County Cricket Club followed by 100* against Kent County Cricket Club. In 2017 he played his last first class game for Loughborough MCCU against Leicestershire County Cricket Club where he achieved his career best bowling figures of 5-54.

References

External links
Basil Akram at ESPNcricinfo
Basil Akram at CricketArchive

1993 births
Living people
Alumni of Loughborough University
English cricketers
Loughborough MCCU cricketers
Hampshire cricketers
People from the London Borough of Waltham Forest
British Asian cricketers